Edwin Felipe Escobar Hill (born July 19, 1969) is a Guatemalan entrepreneur, lecturer and politician who has served as Mayor of Villa Nueva since January 15, 2012. He has also served as President of the National Association of Municipalities of the Republic of Guatemala since 2016.

Edwin Escobar was Dean of Engineering at Universidad Rafael Landívar from 2002 to 2005. During this time, he built TEC Landívar, which consists of 42 laboratories for students of different engineering studies at Universidad Rafael Landívar, Guatemala.

From 1996 to 2004, he was board member and director at “Juannio”, an annual charity art auctions event for the Neurological Institute of Guatemala, of which he also was board director from 2002 to 2004.

From 2008 to 2010, he hosted a TV talk show called "Construyendo Guatemala con Edwin Escobar" (Building Guatemala with Edwin Escobar), which aired on Canal Antigua.

In 2018, he announced that he would participate as a presidential candidate in the 2019 general election for Citizen Prosperity. On March 24, 2019, it was announced that Edwin Escobar would be officially running for President of Guatemala.

References

1969 births
Living people
People from Guatemala City
Guatemalan politicians
National Change Union politicians
Renewed Democratic Liberty politicians
Patriotic Party (Guatemala) politicians